The 2017–18 Feldhockey-Bundesliga was the 76th season of the top German league for field hockey clubs. The season started in on 9 September 2017 and concluded with the championship final on 10 June 2018. Mannheimer HC were the defending champions, while Düsseldorfer HC and Münchner SC entered as the promoted teams from the 2016–17 2. Bundesliga.

Rot-Weiss Köln won the regular season with an eight point lead, they qualified together with Mannheimer HC, Uhlenhorst Mülheim and Harvetshude for the Final Four. In the Final Four or championship playoff Uhlenhorst Mülheim and Rot-Weiss Köln qualified for the final where Uhlenhorst Mülheim won 3–2 and they won their 17th title after a 21 year wait.

Teams 

Twelve teams competed in the league – the top ten teams from the previous season and the two teams promoted from the 2. Bundesliga. The promoted teams were Düsseldorfer HC and Münchner SC, who replaced Klipper THC and Lichterfelde.

Number of teams by state

Regular season

League table

Results

Top goalscorers

Championship playoff
The playoffs were played on 9 and 10 June 2018 in Krefeld.

Semi-finals

Final

References

External links
hockey.de page
Flashscore page

Feldhockey Bundesliga (Men's field hockey)
Bundesliga 2017–18
Feldhockey-Bundesliga 2017–18
Feldhockey-Bundesliga 2017–18